Paul Kirkham (born 5 July 1969) is a former professional footballer who played as a striker in the Football League for Huddersfield Town.

Early career
He began his career as a trainee with Manchester United, but he never played for the first team. So he joined Huddersfield Town in 1987 by then-manager Steve Smith. But in October 1987 he was replaced by Malcolm MacDonald into what is widely recognised as the club's worst ever season. Kirkham was to play only a minor role in the tragedy though, his only appearance came from the substitutes bench in a 2–1 home defeat by Ipswich Town on 8 April 1988, he replaced Peter Ward. With relegation confirmed a month later MacDonald was sacked and assistant, Eoin Hand took charge. Hand then sent him on loan to Waterford United in October 1988 . Kirkham returned to Huddersfield reserves but left in March 1989 to join non-league Hyde United.

Non League Career
Kirkham enjoyed a successful three years at Hyde where he scored 41 goals in 102 league games. He left in 1992 to join Conference side, Stalybridge Celtic, he would remain there until 1994 when he departed for Witton Albion. He was to only play 6 league games. He rejoined Hyde in the same year but was to only remain there for 20 league games. He then moved on to Ashton United where he scored 6 goals in 10 games, he also scored on his first and last games for the club. He then hooked up with Mossley where he would play 4 games before again moving on to Flixton, Warrington Town, Flixton (again), Droylsden and Trafford before calling it a day in 1999.

Assistant Manager
Kirkham became Assistant Manager to Chris O'Brien at Abbey Hey in 2001. He left to join Woodley Sports, again as assistant manager, this time to Tony Hancock, in 2003. He left there in 2005 to join New Mills, again as AM to Hancock, where he remained until the March of the 2009–10 season.

Paul now works as a teacher at Marple Sixth Form College in the sport department, where he is coaching the best striker in the North West, Joshua Longden, who has scored 50 goals in 30 games. Josh is currently undergoing a trial at Stoke City with the likes of Tyreece Campbell and Sam Harvey.

References

1969 births
Living people
Footballers from Manchester
English footballers
Association football forwards
English Football League players
Manchester United F.C. players
Huddersfield Town A.F.C. players
Hyde United F.C. players
Stalybridge Celtic F.C. players
Witton Albion F.C. players
Ashton United F.C. players
Mossley A.F.C. players
Flixton F.C. players
Warrington Town F.C. players
Trafford F.C. players
Droylsden F.C. players
Waterford F.C. players
League of Ireland players